The 1978 United States Senate election in Kentucky took place on November 7, 1978. Incumbent U.S. Senator Walter Dee Huddleston was re-elected to a second term. , this was the last time the Democrats, or anyone other than Mitch McConnell, won the Class 2 Senate seat in Kentucky.

Republican primary

Candidates
Louie Guenthner Jr, Member of the Kentucky House of Representatives 
Oline Carmical
Thurman Jerome Hamlin

Results

Democratic primary

Candidates
Walter Huddleston, incumbent U.S. Senator
Jack Watson
William Taylor
George Tolhurst

Results

General election

Results

See also
 1978 United States Senate elections

References 

1978
Kentucky
United States Senate